Kálmán János Kádár (born 11 June 1979) is a Romanian water polo player.

Kádár, who comes from the Hungarian minority in Romania, was part of the Romania men's national water polo team that competed at the 2012 Summer Olympics.

References

Romanian sportspeople of Hungarian descent
Romanian male water polo players
1979 births
Living people
Olympic water polo players of Romania
Water polo players at the 2012 Summer Olympics
Sportspeople from Oradea